"I Will Fail You" is the third single by American Christian metal band Demon Hunter from their seventh studio album, Extremist. The song is the band's most commercially successful single to date.

About
Vocalist Ryan Clark has said the song is about the scrutiny the band faces, and how they aren't "holy enough" for some people, no matter how much they express their beliefs.

Music video
The song's music video begins with vocalist Ryan Clark standing on the side of the road, looking distraught. As the song begins, he gets in the car and begins to sing the song's lyrics while driving. After the first chorus, it begins to rain. During the second chorus, the rain stops and Clark lights a cigarette, while still driving; after a while he takes some pills to keep him awake. Near the song's end, he starts to fall asleep and the video cuts to someone who has been tied up and gagged. As Clark falls asleep, the video pans out to reveal the person is sitting in the car next to him. As the video ends, the headlights of an oncoming car can be seen as the other man starts to panic.

The video was directed by photographer Caleb Kuhl.

Reception
Greg Kennelty of Metal Injection compared Clark's vocals to that of the late David Gold of Woods of Ypres. Kennelty said the pitch correction is noticeable, but overall declared the song to be good. Axl Rosenberg of MetalSucks compared the song negatively to post-grunge band Staind.

Chart performance

Personnel
 Ryan Clark – vocals
 Patrick Judge – lead guitar
 Jeremiah Scott – rhythm guitar
 Jon Dunn – bass
 Timothy Watts – drums

References

Demon Hunter songs
2014 singles
2014 songs
Solid State Records singles